A host of legendary creatures, animals, and mythic humanoids occur in ancient Greek mythology. Anything related to mythology is mythological. A mythological creature (also mythical or fictional entity) is a type of fictional entity, typically a hybrid, that has not been proven and that is described in folklore (including myths and legends), but may be featured in historical accounts before modernity. Something mythological can also be described as mythic, mythical, or mythologic.

Mythological creatures
 Aeternae, creatures with bony, saw-toothed protuberances sprouting from their heads. 
 Alcyoneus, a giant.
 Almops, a giant son of the god Poseidon and the half-nymph Helle.
 Aloadae, a group of giants who capture the god Ares.
 Amphisbaena, a serpent with a head at each end.
 Arae, female daemons of curses, called forth from the underworld.
 Argus or Argus Panoptes, a hundred-eyed giant.
 Asterius, a giant.
 Athos, a giant.
 Basilisk, a snake that kills anyone who lays eyes on it.
 Briareus, a Hundred-hander.
 Catoblepas, a buffalo-like creature with shaggy fur, large horns, and a heavy head whose toxic breath or ugly looks could kill. 
 Centaur and Centauride, creatures with a head and neck of a giraffe, the torso of a human, and the body of a horse.
  Centaurs
Agrius, one of the centaurs who fought with Heracles
 Amycus, one of the centaurs who fought at the Centauromachy.
 Asbolus, a centaur. He was a seer who read omens in the flight of birds.
 Bienor, one of the centaurs who fought at the Centauromachy. 
 Centaurus, father of the centaurs.
 Chiron,The ancient trainer of heroes such as Heracles.
 Chthonius, a centaur who was killed by Nestor at the wedding of Pirithous and Hippodamia.
 Cyllarus, one of the centaurs who fought at the Centauromachy.
 Dictys, one of the centaurs who fought at the Centauromachy. 
Elatus, a centaur killed by Heracles.
Eurynomos, one of the Centaurs who fought against the Lapiths at the wedding of Hippodamia.
Eurytion, two different Centaurs bearing the same name.
Eurytus, a centaur present at the wedding of Pirithous and Hippodamia, who caused the conflict between the Lapiths and the centaurs by trying to carry the bride off.
Hylaeus, a centaur who tried to rape Atalanta. She killed him.
Hylonome, a Centauride, wife of Cyllarus.
Nessus, a famous centaur, was killed by Heracles.
Perimedes, one of the centaurs who fought at the Centauromachy.
Phólos.
Pholus, a wise centaur and friend of Heracles.
Rhaecus, a centaur who tried to rape Atalanta, who Atalanta then killed. 
 Rhoetus, a centaur who fought and killed at the Centauromachy.
Thaumas.
 Cyprian centaurs, bull-horned centaurs native to the island of Cyprus. 
 Lamian centaurs or Lamian Pheres, twelve rustic spirits of the Lamos river. They were instructed by Zeus to guard the infant Dionysus, protecting him from the machinations of Hera, but the enraged goddess transformed them into ox-horned centaurs. They accompanied Dionysus in his campaign against the Indians.
 Aescaus
 Amphithemis
 Ceteus
 Eurybios
 Faunus
 Gleneus
 Nomeon
 Orthaon
 Petraeus
 Phanes
 Riphonus
 Spargeus
 Winged centaurs
 Cerastes, spineless serpents with a set of ram-like horns on their heads.
 Cerberus, a three headed dog, pet of Hades
 Cetus or Ceto, sea monsters.
 Ceuthonymus, daemon of the underworld. Father of Menoetius.
 Charon, the ferryman of Hades, who transports the dead across the River Styx
 Charybdis, a sea monster whose inhalations formed a deadly whirlpool or a huge water mouth.
 Chimera, a fire-breathing, three-headed monster with one head of a lion, one of a snake, and another of a goat, lion claws in front and goat legs behind, and a long snake tail.
 Chthonius, a giant.
 Crocotta or Cynolycus, a creature with the body of a stag, a lion's neck, cloven hooves, and a wide mouth with a sharp, bony ridge in place of teeth. It imitates the human voice, calls men by name at night, and devours those who approach it. 
 Cyclopes one-eyed giants.
 Arges, one of the children of Gaia and Uranus. Uranus locked him in Tartarus.
 Brontes, one of the children of Gaia and Uranus. Uranus locked him in Tartarus.
 Steropes, one of the children of Gaia and Uranus. Uranus locked him in Tartarus.
 Polyphemus, son of Poseidon, who was outwitted and blinded by Odysseus. 
 Assistants of the god Hephaestus at his workshops. 
 Daemons
 Agathodaemon
 Cacodemon
 Eudaemon
 Daemones Ceramici, five malevolent spirits who plagued the craftsman potter.
 Asbestos
Omodamos
Sabaktes
Smaragos
Syntribos
 Damysus, the fastest of the giants.
 Demogorgon
 Derceto, was a half-woman-half fish goddess.
 Diomedes of Thrace, was a giant, the son of Ares and Cyrene.
 Dryad, tree spirits that look similar to women.
 Echion, a giant.
 Eidolon, spirit-image of a living or dead person; a shade or phantom look-alike of the human form.
 Empusa, beautiful demonesses, with flaming hair and with one brass leg and the other one a donkey leg, who preyed on human blood and flesh.
 Enceladus or Enkelados, a giant who battled Athena in the war against the gods.
 Eurynomos, the netherworld daemon of rotting corpses dwelling in the Underworld.
 Eurytus, a giant.
 Gegenees, six-armed giants which were slain by the Argonauts.
 Gello, a female demon or revenant who threatens the reproductive cycle by causing infertility, miscarriage, and infant mortality.
 Geryon, a giant: according to Hesiod, Geryon had one body and three heads, whereas the tradition followed by Aeschylus gave him three bodies. A lost description by Stesichorus said that he has six hands and six feet and is winged; there are some mid-sixth-century Chalcidian vases portraying Geryon as winged. Some accounts state that he had six legs as well, while others state that the three bodies were joined to one pair of legs. 
Ghosts, Shades, Spirits.
 Gigantes, were a race of great strength and aggression. Archaic and Classical representations show Gigantes as human in form. Later representations show Gigantes with snakes for legs.
 Gorgons, female monsters depicted as having snakes on their head instead of hair, and sometimes described as having tusks, wings, and brazen claws.
Euryale, whose scream could kill.
Medusa, whose gaze could turn anyone to stone, was killed by Perseus.
Stheno, the third gorgon sister
 Graeae, three old women with one tooth and one eye among them. Also known as the Graeae sisters.
 Deino
 Enyo
 Pemphredo
 Griffin or Gryphon or Gryps or Grypes, a creature that combines a lion's body and an eagle's head and wings.
Harpies, a creature with the torso, head, and arms of a woman, and the talons, tail, and wings (mixed with the arms) of a bird. Very small but can be vicious when provoked.
Aello
Celaeno
Ocypete
 Hecatonchires, three giants of incredible strength and ferocity, each with a hundred arms; also called Centimanes.
 Briareos or Aegaeon 
 Cottus 
 Gyges 
 Hippalectryon, a creature with the fore parts of a horse and the hind parts of a cockerel/rooster.
 Hippocampus, a creature with the upper body of a horse and the lower body of a fish. Created by Poseidon when he offered them to Athens.
 Hydras 
 Lernaean Hydra, a many-headed, serpent-like creature that guarded an Underworld entrance beneath Lake Lerna. It was destroyed by Heracles, in his second Labour. Son of Typhon and Echidna.
 Ichthyocentaurs, a pair of marine centaurs with the upper bodies of men, the lower fronts of horses, and the tails of fish.
 Aphros 
 Bythos 
 Ipotane, a race of half-horse, half-humans. The Ipotanes are considered the original version of the centaurs. 
 Keres, the spirit of violent or cruel death.
 Achlys, who may have been numbered amongst the Keres. She was represented on the shield of Heracles.
 Kobaloi, a mischievous creature fond of tricking and frightening mortals.
 Laestrygonians or Laestrygones, a tribe of giant cannibals.
 Antiphates, King of the Laestrygonians.
 Lamia
 Lion-Headed Giants
 Leon or Lion, killed by Herakles in the war against the gods. 
 Manticore or Androphagos, having the body of a red lion, a human face with three rows of sharp teeth, and the wings of a bat or dragon. The manticore can shoot spikes out of its tail, making it a deadly foe.
 Merpeople, humans with fish tail after torso (Mermaid as female, Merman as male). They lure adventurers to drown them.
 Mimas, a giant.
 Minotaur, a monster with the head of a bull and the body of a man; slain by Theseus in the Labyrinth created by Daedelus.
 Multi-headed Dogs
 Cerberus (Hellhound), the three-headed giant hound that guarded the gates of the Underworld.
 Orthrus, a two-headed dog, brother of Cerberus, slain by Heracles.
 Nymph
 Odontotyrannos, a beast with a black, horse-like head, with three horns protruding from its forehead, and exceeded the size of an elephant. 
 Onocentaur, part human, part donkey. It had the head and torso of a human with the body of a donkey.
 Ophiotaurus (Bull-Serpent), a creature part bull and part serpent.
 Orion, giant huntsman whom Zeus placed among the stars as the constellation of Orion by Artemis.
 Ouroboros, an immortal self-eating, circular being. The being is a serpent or a dragon curled into a circle or hoop, biting its tail.
 Pallas, a giant.
 Panes, a tribe of nature spirits that had the heads and torsos of men, the legs and tails of goats, goatish faces, and goat-horns.
 Periboea, a Giantess. Daughter of the king of the giants.
 Philinnion, an unwed maiden who died prematurely and returned from the tomb as the living dead to consort with a handsome youth named Makhates. When her mother discovered the girl she collapsed back into death and was burned by the terrified townsfolk beyond the town boundaries.
 Phoenix, a golden-red firebird of which only one could live at a time, but would burst into flames to rebirth from ashes as a new phoenix.
 Picolous, one of the Giants.
 Polybotes, a giant.
 Porphyrion, a giant, king of the giants.
 Satyrs and Satyresses, creatures with upper human bodies, and the horns and hindquarters of a goat. Some were companions of Pan and Dionysus.
Agreus
Ampelos
Marsyas
Nomios
Silenus or Papposilenus, companion and tutor to the wine god Dionysus.
 Scylla, once a nereid, transformed by Circe into a many-headed, tentacled monster who fed on passing sailors in the straits between herself and Charybdis by plucking them off the ship and eating them.
 Scythian Dracanae, upper body of a woman, lower body composed of two snake tails.
 Sea goats, creatures having the back end of a fish and the front parts of a goat.
 Sirens, bird-like women whose irresistible song lured sailors to their deaths.
 Skolopendra, a giant sea monster said to be the size of a Greek trireme. It has a crayfish-like tail, numerous legs along its body which it uses like oars to move, and extremely long hairs that protrude from its nostrils. Child of Phorcys and Keto.
 Spartae, a malevolent spirit born from violence. Argo crew member Jason fought alongside these creatures after discovering the dragon teeth could create these violent spirits. Spartae is generally depicted as skeletal beings with some form of weapon and military attire.
 Sphinx
 Androsphinx or simply Sphinx, a creature with the head of a human and the body of a lion.
 Criosphinx, a creature with the head of a ram and the body of a lion.
 Hieracosphinx, a creature with the head of a hawk and the body of a lion.
 Stymphalian birds, man-eating birds with beaks of bronze and sharp metallic feathers they could launch at their victims.
 Tarandos, a rare animal with the size of an ox and the head of a deer. It could change the color of its hair according to the environment that it was, like a chameleon. It was living at the land of the Scythians. Solinus, wrote about a similar creature in Aethiopia and called it Parandrus.
 Taraxippi, ghosts that frightened horses.
 Thoon, a giant.
 Three-Bodied or Triple-Bodied Daemon, a winged monster with three human bodies ending in serpent-tails.
Tityos, a giant.
 Triton, son of Poseidon and Amphitrite, half-man and half-fish.
 Typhon or Typhoeus, a humongous savage monster with snake coils instead of limbs; father of several other monsters with his mate Echidna. Almost destroyed the gods but was foiled by Hermes and Zeus. 
 Unicorns or Monocerata, creatures as large as horses, or even larger with a large, pointed, spiraling horn projecting from their forehead.
 Vampire Daemons/ Lamiai.
 Corinthian Lamia, a vampiric demon who seduced the handsome youth Menippos in the guise of a beautiful woman to consume his flesh and blood.
 Empousa, seductive female vampire demons with fiery hair, a leg of bronze, and a donkey's foot. They are especially good at ensnaring men with their beauty before devouring them.
 Lamia, a vampiric demon who by voluptuous artifices attracted young men, to enjoy their fresh, youthful, and pure flesh and blood.
 Mormo or Mormolyceae or Mormolyce, a vampiric creature that preyed on children.
 Mormolykeia, female underworld Daemons, attendants of the goddess Hecate.
 Werewolf or Lycanthrope.
 Agriopas, he tasted the viscera of a human child and was turned into a wolf for ten years.
 Damarchus, a boxer from Parrhasia (Arcadia) who is said to have changed his shape into that of a wolf at the festival of Lykaia, became a man again after ten years.
 Lycaon, turned into a wolf by the gods as punishment for serving them his murdered son Nyctimus' flesh at a feast.
 Lykos (Λύκος) of Athens was a wolf-shaped herο, whose shrine stood by the jury court, and the first jurors were named after him. 
 Winged Horses or Pterippi, winged horses.
Pegasus, a divine winged stallion that is pure white, son of Medusa and Poseidon, brother of Chrysaor, and father of winged horses.
 Ethiopian Pegasus, winged, horned horses native to Ethiopia.

Animals from Greek mythology

 Birds
Acanthis (Carduelis)
 Alectryon (Rooster). Alectryon was a youth, charged by Ares to stand guard outside his door while the god indulged in illicit love with Aphrodite. He fell asleep, and Helios, the sun god, walked in on the couple. Ares turned Alectryon into a rooster, which never forgets to announce the arrival of the sun in the morning.
 Autonous (Stone-curlew)
 Birds of Ares or Ornithes Areioi were a flock of birds that guarded the Amazons' shrine of the god on a coastal island in the Black Sea. The Argonauts encountered them in their quest for the Golden Fleece.
 Cranes
Gerana, a queen of the Pygmy who was transformed by the goddess Hera into a crane.
 Oenoe.
 Diomedes Birds, the Diomedes companions were transformed into seabirds
 Eagles
Aethon or Caucasian Eagle, a giant eagle, offspring of Typhon and Echidna. Zeus condemned Prometheus for having his liver eaten by the Caucasian Eagle for giving the Flames of Olympus to the mortals.
Aetos Dios, giant golden eagle of Zeus.
Hippodamia (Lark)
Kingfisher 
Alcyone transformed by gods into halcyon birds, the Halcyon genus and Halcyonidae birds took the name from Alcyone.
 Alkyonides, the seven daughters of Alcyoneus. When their father was slain by Heracles, they threw themselves into the sea, and were transformed into halcyons by Amphitrite.
 Ceyx transformed by gods into halcyon birds, the Ceyx birds took their name from Ceyx.
Nightingale
 Aëdon 
 Procne
 Owls
 Little Owl, bird of goddess Athena.
 Nyctimene
 Screech Owl (Ascalaphus), bird of god Hades.
Philomela (Swallow)
 Ravens/Crows
Corone
Coronis
Corvus, a crow or raven which served Apollo. Apollo was about to make a sacrifice on the altar and he needs some water to perform the ritual. The god sends the raven to fetch some water in his cup, but the bird gets distracted by a fig tree and spends a few days lazily resting and waiting for the figs to ripen. After feasting on the figs, the raven finally brings Apollo the cup filled with water and he also brings a water snake (Hydra) as an excuse for being so late. Apollo sees through the raven's lies and angrily casts all three – the cup (Crater, Crater (constellation)), the water snake (Hydra, Hydra (constellation)), and the raven (Corvus, Corvus (constellation)) into the sky. Apollo also casts a curse on the raven, scorching its feathers and making the bird eternally thirsty and unable to do anything about it. According to the myth, this is how crows and ravens came to have black feathers and why they have such raspy voices.
Lycius
 Swans
 Cycnus (Swan), Cycnus, was a good friend of Phaethon, when Phaethon died, he sat by the river Eridanos mourning his death. The gods turned him into a swan to relieve him of his pity.
 Swans of Apollo, the swans drawing the chariot of Apollo.
Strix, birds of ill omen, a product of metamorphosis, that fed on human flesh and blood.
Tereus (Hoopoe)
 Boars
Calydonian Boar, a gigantic boar sent by Artemis to ravage Calydon. Was slain in the Calydonian Boar Hunt.
 Clazomenae Boar, gigantic winged sow which terrorized the Greek town of Klazomenai in Ionia, Asia Minor.
 Crommyonian Sow, the Crommyonian Sow was a wild pig that ravaged the region around the village of Crommyon between Megara and Corinth and was eventually slain by Theseus in his early adventures.
 Erymanthian Boar, a gigantic boar that Heracles was sent to retrieve as one of his labors.
Bugs
Gadflies, mythical insects sent by the gods to sting wicked mortals for their cruel acts.
Myrmekes, large ants that can range in size from small dogs to giant bears which guarded a hill that had rich deposits of gold.
Myrmidons, ants which transformed into humans.
 Cattle
 The Cattle of Geryon, magnificent cattle guarded by Orthrus.
 The Cattle of Helios, immortal cattle of oxen and sheep owned by the sun titan Helios.
 The black-skinned cattle of Hades, the cattle owned by Hades and guarded by Menoetes.
 Cercopes, monkeys. 
 Cretan Bull/Marathonian Bull, was the bull Pasiphaë fell in love with, giving birth to the Minotaur.
 Deer
Actaeon, Artemis turned him into a deer for spying on her while bathing. He was promptly eaten by his own hunting dogs.
Ceryneian Hind, an enormous deer which was sacred to Artemis; Heracles was sent to retrieve it as one of his labours
 Elaphoi Khrysokeroi, four immortal golden-horned deer sacred to the goddess Artemis.
 Dionysus' Panthers, the panthers that draw the chariot of Dionysus.
 Dogs/Hounds
 Actaeon's dogs
 Argos, Odysseus' faithful dog, known for his speed, strength and his superior tracking skills.
 Golden Dog, a dog that guarded the infant god Zeus. 
 Guard Dogs of Hephaestus Temple, a pack of sacred dogs that guarded the temple of Hephaestus at Mount Etna. 
 Laelaps, a female dog destined always to catch its prey.
 Maera, the hound of Erigone, daughter of Icarius of Athens.
 Hellhounds
 Dolphins
 Delphin, a dolphin who found the Amphitrite, when Poseidon was looking for her. For his service, Poseidon placed him in the sky as the constellation Delphinus.
 Dolphin that saved Arion.
 Dolphins of Taras. A dolphin saved Taras, who is often depicted mounted on a dolphin.
 Donkeys
 Donkey of Hephaestus, Hephaestus was often shown riding a donkey.
 Donkey of Silenus, Silenus rode a donkey.
 Scythian horned donkeys, in Scythia there were donkeys with horns, and these horns were holding water from the river Styx.
 Goats
 Amalthea, golden-haired female goat, foster-mother of Zeus.
 Horses
 Anemoi, the gods of the four directional winds in horse-shape drawing the chariot of Zeus.
 Boreas
 Eurus
 Notos
 Zephyrus or Zephyr
 Arion, the immortal horse of Adrastus, which could run at fantastic speeds. Was said to eat gold.
 Horses of Achilles, immortal horses.
 Balius
 Xanthus
 Horses of Ares, immortal fire-breathing horses of the god Ares.
 Aethon
 Konabos
 Phlogeous
 Phobos
 Horses of Autonous, 
 Horses of Eos, a pair of immortal horses owned by the dawn-goddess, Eos.
 Lampus
 Phaethon
 Horses of Erechtheus, a pair of immortal horses owned by the king of Athens, Erechtheus.
 Podarkes
 Xanthos
 Horses of Dioskouroi, the immortal horses of the Dioskouroi.
 Harpagos
 Kyllaros
 Phlogeus
 Xanthos
 Horses of Hector
 Aethon
 Lampus
 Podargus
 Xanthus
 Horses of Helios, immortal horses of the sun-god Helios.
 Abraxas
 Aethon
 Bronte
 Euos
 Phlegon
 Pyrois
 Sterope
 Therbeeo
 Horses of Poseidon, immortal horses of the god Poseidon.
 Mares of Diomedes, four man-eating horses belonging to the giant Diomedes.
 Dinus
 Lampus
 Podargus
 Xanthus
 Ocyrhoe, daughter of Chiron and Chariclo. She was transformed into a horse.
 Trojan Horses or Trojan Hippoi, twelve immortal horses owned by the Trojan king Laomedon.
 Karkinos or Carcinus, a giant crab that fought Heracles alongside the Lernaean Hydra.
 Leopards
 Ampelus, Claudius Aelianus in the "Characteristics of Animals" writes that there is a leopard called the Ampelus, it is not like the other leopards and has no tail. If it is seen by women it afflicts them with an unexpected ailment.
Dionysus' Leopard: Dionysus is often shown riding a leopard.
 Lions
 Nemean Lion, a gigantic lion whose skin was impervious to weapons; was strangled by Heracles.
 Lion of Cithaeron, a lion that was killed by Heracles or by Alcathous.
 Rhea's Lions, the lions drawing the chariot of Rhea.
 Snakes
 Gigantic snakes of Libya, according to Diodorus, Amazons used the skins of large snakes for protective devices, since Libya had such animals of incredible size.
 Snakes of Hera, Hera sent two big snakes to kill Herakles when he was an infant.
 Water-snake, god Apollo was about to make a sacrifice on the altar and he needs some water to perform the ritual. The god sends the raven to fetch some water in his cup, but the bird gets distracted by a fig tree and spends a few days lazily resting and waiting for the figs to ripen. After feasting on the figs, the raven finally brings Apollo the cup filled with water and he also brings a water snake (Hydra) as an excuse for being so late. Apollo sees through the raven's lies and angrily casts all three – the cup (Crater, Crater (constellation)), the water snake (Hydra, Hydra (constellation)), and the raven (Corvus, Corvus (constellation)) into the sky.
 Teumessian fox, a gigantic fox destined never to be hunted down.
 Tortoises/Turtles
 Giant turtle: Sciron robbed travelers passing the Sceironian Rocks and forced them to wash his feet. When they knelt before him, he kicked them over the cliff into the sea, where they were eaten by the giant sea turtle. Theseus killed him in the same way.
 Tortoise from which Hermes created his tortoiseshell lyre, when Hermes was a mere babe, found a tortoise, which he killed, and, stretching seven strings across the empty shell, invented a lyre.
 Zeus and the Tortoise

Dragons
The dragons of Greek mythology were serpentine monsters. They include the serpent-like Drakons, the marine-dwelling Cetea, and the she-monster Dracaenae. Homer describes the dragons with wings and legs.
 The Colchian Dragon, an unsleeping dragon that guarded the Golden Fleece.
 Cychreides, a dragon that terrorized Salamis before being slain, tamed, or driven out by Cychreus.
Delphyne, female dragon.
 Demeter's dragons, a pair of winged dragons that drew Demeter's chariot and, after having been given as a gift, that of Triptolemus.
 Giantomachian dragon, a dragon that was thrown at Athena during the Giant war. She threw it into the sky where it became the constellation Draco.
The Ismenian Dragon, a dragon which guarded the sacred spring of Ares near Thebes; it was slain by Cadmus.
Ladon, a serpent-like dragon that guarded the golden apples of the immortality of the Hesperides.
 Lernaean Hydra, also known as King Hydra, is a many-headed, serpent-like creature that guarded an Underworld entrance beneath Lake Lerna. It was destroyed by Heracles, in his second Labour. Son of Typhon and Echidna.
 Maeonian Drakon, a dragon that lived in the kingdom of Lydia and was killed by Damasen.
 Medea's dragons, a pair of flying dragons that pulled Medea's chariot. Born from the blood of the Titans.
 Nemean dragon, a dragon that guarded Zeus' sacred grove in Nemea.
 Ophiogenean dragon, a dragon that guarded Artemis' sacred grove in Mysia.
 Pitanian dragon, a dragon in Pitane, Aeolis, that was turned to stone by the gods.
 Pyrausta, a four-legged insect with filmy wings and a dragon's head.
 Python, a dragon that guarded the oracle of Delphi; it was slain by Apollo.
 Rhodian dragons, serpents that inhabited the island of Rhodes; they were killed by Phorbus.
 Thespian dragon, a dragon that terrorized the city of Thespiae in Boeotia.
 Trojan dragons, a pair of dragons or giant serpents from Tenedos sent by various gods to kill Laocoön and his sons in order to stop him from telling his people that the Wooden Horse was a trap.

Drakons
Drakons ("δράκους" in Greek, "dracones" in Latin) were giant serpents, sometimes possessing multiple heads or able to breathe fire (or even both), but most just spit deadly poison. They are usually depicted without wings.

 The Ethiopian Dragon was a breed of giant serpent native to the lands of Ethiopia. They killed elephants and rivaled the longest-lived animals. They mentioned in the work of Aelian, On The Characteristics Of Animals
 The Indian Dragon was a breed of the giant serpent which could fight and strangle the elephants of India.
The Laconian Drakon was one of the most fearsome of all the drakons.

Cetea
Cetea were sea monsters. They were usually featured in myths of a hero rescuing a sacrificial princess.
 The Ethiopian Cetus was a sea monster sent by Poseidon to ravage Ethiopia and devour Andromeda. It was slain by Perseus.
 The Trojan Cetus was a sea monster that plagued Troy before being slain by Heracles.
 Cetea at Taprobana were sea monsters at Taprobana (modern Sri Lanka).

Dracaenae
The Dracaenae were monsters that had the upper body of a beautiful woman and the lower body of any sort of dragon. Echidna, the mother of monsters, and Ceto, the mother of sea monsters, are two famous dracaenae. Some Dracaenae were even known to have had in place of two legs, one (or two) serpent tail.
 Campe, a dracaena that was charged by Cronus with the job of guarding the gates of Tartarus; she was slain by Zeus when he rescued the Cyclopes and Hecatoncheires from their prison.
 Ceto (or Keto), a marine goddess who was the mother of all sea monsters as well as Echidna and other dragons and monsters.
 Echidna, wife of Typhon and mother of monsters.
 Poena, a dracaena sent by Apollo to ravage the kingdom of Argos as punishment for the death of his infant son Linos; killed by Coraebus.
Scylla, a dracaena that was the lover of Poseidon, transformed by Circe into a multi-headed monster that fed on sailors on vessels passing between her and Charybdis.
 Scythian Dracaena, the Dracaena queen of Scythia; she stole Geryon's cattle that Heracles was herding through the region and agreed to return them on condition he mate with her.
 Sybaris, a draceana that lived on a mountain near Delphi, eating shepherds and passing travellers; she was pushed off the cliff by Eurybarus.

Automatons
Automatons, or Colossi, were men/women, animals and monsters crafted out of metal and made animate in order to perform various tasks. They were created by the divine smith, Hephaestus. The Athenian inventor Daedalus also manufactured automatons.
 The Hippoi Kabeirikoi, four bronze horse-shaped automatons crafted by Hephaestus to draw the chariot of the Cabeiri.
 The Keledones, singing maidens sculpted out of gold by Hephaestus.
 The Khalkotauroi also known as the Colchis Bulls, fire-breathing bulls created by Hephaestus as a gift for Aeëtes.
 The Kourai Khryseai, golden maidens sculpted by Hephaestus to attend him in his household.
 Talos, a giant man made out of bronze to protect Europa.

Mythic humanoids
 Acephali/Headless men (Greek ἀκέφαλος akephalos, plural ἀκέφαλοι akephaloi, from ἀ- a-, "without", and κεφαλή kephalé, "head") are humans without a head, with their mouths and eyes being in their breasts.
 Amazons, a nation of all-female warriors.
 Aegea, a queen of the Amazons.
 Aella (Ἄελλα), an Amazon who was killed by Heracles.
 Alcibie (Ἀλκιβίη), an Amazonian warrior, killed by Diomedes at Troy.
 Alke (Ἁλκή), an Amazonian warrior
 Antandre (Ἀντάνδρη), an Amazonian warrior, killed by Achilles at Troy.
 Antiope (Ἀντιόπη), a daughter of Ares and sister of Hippolyta.
 Areto (Ἀρετώ), an Amazon.
 Asteria (Ἀστερία), an Amazon who was killed by Heracles.
 Bremusa (Βρέμουσα), an Amazonian warrior, killed by Idomeneus at Troy.
 Celaeno (Κελαινώ), an Amazonian warrior, killed by Heracles.
 Eurypyle (Εὐρυπύλη), an Amazon leader who invaded Ninus and Babylonia.
 Hippolyta (Ἱππολύτη), a queen of Amazons and daughter of Ares.
 Hippothoe (Ἱπποθόη), an Amazonian warrior, killed by Achilles at Troy.
 Iphito (Ἰφιτώ), an Amazon who served under Hippolyta.
 Lampedo (Λαμπεδώ), an Amazon queen who ruled with her sister Marpesia.
 Marpesia (Μαρπεσία), an Amazon queen who ruled with her sister Lampedo.
 Melanippe (Μελανίππη), a daughter of Ares and sister of Hippolyta and Antiope.
 Molpadia (Μολπαδία), an Amazon who killed Antiope.
 Myrina (Μύρινα), a queen of the Amazons.
 Orithyia (Ὠρείθυια), an Amazon queen.
 Otrera (Ὀτρήρα), an Amazon queen, consort of Ares and mother of Hippolyta.
 Pantariste (Πανταρίστη), an Amazon who fought with Hippolyta against Heracles.
 Penthesilea (Πενθεσίλεια), an Amazon queen who fought in the Trojan War on the side of Troy.
 Thalestris (Θάληστρις), a queen of the Amazons.
 Anthropophage, mythical race of cannibals.
 Arimaspi, a tribe of one-eyed men.
 Astomi, race of people who had no need to eat or drink anything at all. 
 Atlantians, people of Atlantis.
 Bebryces, a tribe of people who lived in Bithynia
 Chalybes, a Georgian tribe of Pontus and Cappadocia in northern Anatolia.
 Curetes, legendary people who took part in the quarrel over the Calydonian Boar.
 Cynocephaly, dog-headed people.
 Dactyls, mythical race of small phallic male beings.
 Acmon
 Gargareans, were an all-male tribe.
 Halizones, people that appear in Homer's Iliad as allies of Troy during the Trojan War. 
 Hemicynes, half-dog people.
 Hyperboreans, mythical people who lived "beyond the North Wind". 
 Korybantes, were armed and crested dancers.
 Lapiths
 Corythus, a Lapith killed by the centaur Rhoetus at the Centauromachy.
 Crantor
 Dryas, a Lapith who fought against the centaurs at the Centauromachy.
 Elatus, a Lapith chieftain of Larissa.
 Euagrus or Evagrus, a Lapith killed by the centaur Rhoetus at the Centauromachy. 
 Ixion, king of the Lapiths.
 Pirithous, king of the Lapiths.
 Lotus-eaters, people living on an island dominated by lotus plants. The lotus fruits and flowers were the primary food of the island and were narcotic, causing the people to sleep in peaceful apathy.
 Machlyes, hermaphrodites whose bodies were male on one side and female on the other.
 Minyans
 Monopodes or Skiapodes, a tribe of one-legged Libyan men who used their gigantic foot as shade against the midday sun.
 Myrmidons, legendary warriors commanded by Achilles.
 Panotii, a tribe of northern men with gigantic, body-length ears.
 Pygmies, a tribe of one and a half foot tall African men who rode goats into battle against migrating cranes.
 Gerana
 Oenoe
 Spartoi, mythical warriors who sprang up from the dragon's teeth.
 Telchines
 Troglodytae

Deified human beings
In addition to the famous deities, the ancient Greeks also worshiped a number of deified human beings. For example, Alabandus at Alabanda, Tenes at Tenedos, Leucothea and her son Palaemon were worshiped throughout Greece.

See also
 List of Greek mythological figures - primordial deities, Titans, Olympians, Moirai, Charites, Muses, Nymphs and others
 List of minor Greek mythological figures
 List of legendary creatures
 List of legendary creatures by type

References

Sources
 
 Morford, Mark; Robert Lenardon (2003). Classical Mythology (7 ed.). New York: Oxford University Press.

Greek legendary creatures
Greek mythological creatures
creatures